Wallkill may refer to the following in the U.S. state of New York:

Wallkill, Orange County, New York, a town
Wallkill, Ulster County, New York, a hamlet and census-designated place
Wallkill Correctional Facility, in Ulster County
Wallkill River, a tributary of the Hudson River
Wallkill Valley, part of the Hudson Valley

See also